Karaköy Square is an area in Karaköy at the north end of the Galata Bridge on the northern bank of the Golden Horn. It is between the opposing directions of the Kemeraltı Street which temporarily splits at Karaköy Square. The metro stop on a part of the square is called Karaköy Station.

Sources 

Squares in Istanbul
Beyoğlu